George Phydias Mitchell (May 21, 1919 – July 26, 2013) was an American businessman, real estate developer and philanthropist from Texas credited with pioneering the economic extraction of shale gas.

According to The Economist, "few businesspeople have done as much to change the world as George Mitchell."

Early life
Mitchell was born to Greek immigrant parents in the port city of Galveston, Texas in 1919. His father, Savvas Paraskevopoulos, was from the village of Nestani in Arcadia, tended goats before immigrating to the United States in 1901, arriving at Ellis Island at the age of 20. He worked for railroads, and gradually moved west. When a paymaster got tired of writing his long name and threatened to fire him, Mr. Paraskevopoulos took the paymaster's name, Mike Mitchell. Mike Mitchell settled in Galveston, where he ran a succession of shoe-shining and pressing shops. When he saw the picture of a beautiful woman in a local Greek newspaper, he headed for Florida, where she had settled, according to family lore. He persuaded her to abandon her fiancé and marry him. They lived above the shoeshine shop.

Oil and gas business
In 1940, George Mitchell earned a degree in petroleum engineering with an emphasis in geology from Texas A&M University. He graduated as the valedictorian in his class and was also the captain of the men's tennis team.

He started an independent oil and gas company, Mitchell Energy & Development Corp. and built it into a Fortune 500 company. He participated in the development of about 10,000 wells, including more than 1000 wildcat wells.

In the 1980s and 1990s, the company experimented with application of different techniques of hydraulic fracturing of the Barnett Shale of Texas, eventually finding the right technique to economically extract the natural gas in the formation. The new approach has been widely adopted by the gas industry and spawned a new gas boom in North America. The Potential Gas Committee estimates that U.S. recoverable reserves will last 118 years at current production levels. but production is expected to more than triple by 2020. Extracting natural gas from shale rock is rapidly spreading to countries outside the United States. Some consider his innovation important in the context of energy security, making the United States less dependent on foreign sources of energy. Because of the technological progress in industry fracking, George Mitchell is now known as the "pioneer of shale." For this reason, it is proposed that the date of his birth -21 May 1919 – will be considered as the "Shale Day". Mitchell Energy & Development Corp. was later acquired by Devon Energy.

Real estate development
Mitchell was the developer of The Woodlands, an unincorporated yet governmentally structured township in Montgomery County, Texas, which he developed from timberland located 32 miles north of downtown Houston. He brought on landscape architect Ian McHarg to consult on the project. The master plan for the community called for preserving trees, protecting the environment, minimizing flooding and creating a "pleasant" urban environment. In 2010, The Woodlands was home to 97,000 people. When fully developed the population will have reached 130,000. He and his wife Cynthia played a major role in the revitalization of his hometown of Galveston. Mitchell had a lifelong passion for tennis, and the tennis center at Texas A&M University, where he was captain of the tennis team, was named in his honor. Built for an estimated $4.2 million, the official ribbon cutting ceremony was held on October 23, 1998. In 1984, he was the recipient of an honorary doctoral degree from the University of Houston.

Philanthropy

Mitchell and his wife Cynthia, along with the Cynthia and George Mitchell Foundation, have distributed or pledged more than $400 million in grants to causes, programs, and institutions.

The vast majority of this amount is related to science, environmental sustainability, and sustainability science-related fields, including the foundation's current grant-making programs which focus on sustainability science, clean energy, water, and natural gas sustainability.

On December 7, 2010, he joined the Giving Pledge sponsored by Warren Buffett and Bill and Melinda Gates, making public his and Cynthia's long-held private intent that the majority of their wealth would be donated to charitable causes.

According to the National Academies of Science, "In the 1970s [Mitchell] helped sponsor the work of Dennis Meadows, whose Club of Rome study The Limits to Growth was a global wake-up call on the pressing need for sustainable energy technologies and food sources worldwide."

Working with Meadows and other national leaders Mitchell created The Woodlands Conference series and the International George and Cynthia Mitchell Prize, both dedicated to sustainable development. He was particularly interested in the role of the business community in creating sustainable societies and he himself is "a model of linking entrepreneurial success to the sustainability movement". The Mitchells also underwrote the National Academies' Our Common Journey: A Transition Toward Sustainability, the 1999 report that defined the role of science and technology in moving toward sustainability. As a follow-up to Our Common Journey, Mitchell donated $20 million to create the George and Cynthia Mitchell Endowment for Sustainability Science at the National Academy of Sciences committed to advancing science and technology in support of sustainable development.  Mitchell also founded the Houston Advanced Research Center that explores strategies for sustainable development at the regional level. He donated $25 million to the Endowment for Regional Sustainability Science to support HARC's work in sustainability science. Mitchell donated part of his wealth to the Cynthia and George Mitchell Foundation, which supports programs for the efficient and wise use of Earth's resources.

Enabled by Mitchell's donation of $35 million, the Texas A&M University Physics department relocated to two new buildings in late 2009: The George P. and Cynthia W. Mitchell Fundamental Physics and Astronomy Building and the George P. Mitchell Physics Building. In 2012, he committed an additional $20 million to the Mitchell Institute for Fundamental Physics and Astronomy. This donation is the latest in a series supporting science and the physics department in particular. With previous gifts supporting academic chairs, professorships and the Giant Magellan Telescope project, the Mitchells are Texas A&M's most generous modern benefactors, with donations totaling nearly $100 million; by 2011, his total contributions to universities and research organizations had reached $159 million.

Mitchell and his wife were also major supporters of Texas A&M's marine studies orientated branch campus Texas A&M University at Galveston (TAMUG), donating the land for the main campus and the main campus is named in honor of Mitchell's father. Mitchell made numerous other gifts to the university over the years, including the donation of a yacht named S.V. Cynthia Woods named after his wife Cynthia.

Personal life
In 2004, Forbes magazine estimated his net worth as $1.6 billion, placing him among the 500 richest people worldwide. Mitchell died at the age of 94 on July 26, 2013, at his home in Galveston of natural causes, while surrounded by relatives. He was predeceased by his wife, Cynthia, who died on December 27, 2009, and his two brothers, Christie and Johnny. He was survived by his sister, Maria Mitchell Ballantyne; his ten children, daughters Pamela Maguire, Meredith Dreiss and Sheridan Lorenz, and sons Scott, Mark, Kent, Greg, Kirk, Todd and Grant; 23 grandchildren, 5 great grandchildren and 19 nieces and nephews.

Awards and honors
Golden Plate Award of the American Academy of Achievement (1978)
Medal for distinguished achievement from Texas A&M Geosciences and Earth Resources Advisory Council (1980)
Horatio Alger Award, the American Society of Mechanical Engineers’ first Award for Distinguished Service in the Petroleum Industry
Honorary doctoral degree from the University of Houston (1984)
The Galveston Daily News’ Citizen of the Year and the Ima Hogg Historical Achievement Award (1988)
Global Tomorrow Coalition’s Lorax Award for contributions to the environment (1989)
Merrill Lynch, Ernst & Young and Inc. Magazine’s Master Entrepreneur of the Year (1992)
Boy Scouts of America’s Hornaday Award for Environmental Achievement (1993)
Galveston’s Leonora Kempner Thompson Community Enrichment Award (1993)
American Institute of Architects’ Jefferson Award
Texas Business Hall of Fame Award, the National Preservation Honor Award
Texas A&M’s Aggie of the Year (1994)
Governor’s Award for Historic Preservation presented to Mr. And Mrs. Mitchell by Governor George W. Bush (1995)
Houston Chapter of the Texas Society of Certified Public Accountants’ honoree, and the Mirabeau B. Lamar Award (1996)
Nature Conservancy of Texas’ Lifetime Achievement honoree (1997)
Texas Society of Architects’ first Cornerstone Award presented to Mr. And Mrs. Mitchell
Galveston Historical Foundation’s Spirit of Elissa Award
Galveston Chamber of Commerce’s Christie Mitchell Award (1999)
Prevent Blindness Texas’ People of Vision Award presented to Mr. and Mrs. Mitchell
World Future Society’s Distinguished Service Award (2000)
National Trust of Historic Preservation’s Crowninshield Award presented to Mr. and Mrs. Mitchell
Texas Society of Professional Engineers’ Engineering Dream Team member
Pioneer Oil Producers Society’s Distinguished Service Award (2001)
Institute for Energy Law’s John Rogers Award (2002)

References

External links
Funding Universe: Mitchell Energy and Development Corporation
 Mitchell, George and Jim Barlow. George Mitchell Oral History, Houston Oral History Project, November 20, 2007.

1919 births
2013 deaths
American billionaires
American people of Greek descent
Giving Pledgers
21st-century philanthropists
Businesspeople from Texas
Texas A&M University alumni
20th-century American businesspeople
20th-century philanthropists